Cyle Justin Brink (born 16 January 1994) is a South African rugby union player for Bulls in the United Rugby Championship and the  in the Currie Cup. His regular position is flanker.

Career

Youth

While at school at King Edward VII School, Brink was called up to the  side for the 2012 Under-18 Craven Week tournament. The following year, he played in ten matches for the  side during the 2013 Under-19 Provincial Championship competition. During September, he was also drafted into the  side, making four starts for that side during the 2013 Under-21 Provincial Championship.

In 2014, Brink was included in the South Africa Under-20 squad for the 2014 IRB Junior World Championship to be held in New Zealand.

Golden Lions
Brink made his first class debut for the  during the 2014 Vodacom Cup competition. Two weeks later, in his second match for the Golden Lions, he scored his first senior try against neighbours , but it was not enough to prevent them falling to a 22–20 defeat. He made a total of eight starts during the competition – starting all of them and scoring three tries.

Lions
Brink made his debut for the Lions team against the Cheetahs.

Leicester Tigers
On 10 March 2020, Brink would travel to England to sign for Leicester Tigers in the Gallagher Premiership on an undisclosed deal from the 2020–21 season.

Bulls

Honours
 Super Rugby runner up (2) 2017, 2018

References

South African rugby union players
Living people
1994 births
Rugby union players from Johannesburg
Golden Lions players
Rugby union flankers
South Africa Under-20 international rugby union players
Leicester Tigers players
Lions (United Rugby Championship) players
Rugby union number eights
Bulls (rugby union) players
Blue Bulls players